Emre Güsar (born 4 September 1977) is a retired Turkish football defender.

References

1977 births
Living people
Turkish footballers
Kırklarelispor footballers
Altay S.K. footballers
Konyaspor footballers
Göztepe S.K. footballers
Bursaspor footballers
Kayserispor footballers
Kocaelispor footballers
Manisaspor footballers
Karşıyaka S.K. footballers
Mardinspor footballers
Adana Demirspor footballers
Association football defenders
Süper Lig players